Pesalai is one of the well developed village in Mannar District and having a great culture in it and it's situated in the north-west of the island of Mannar in the Mannar District of Sri Lanka.Most of the people in Pesalai are Roman Catholics at the same time it's the shelter of Hinduism and Islam. Pesalai has 3 GN divisions they are Pesalai North, Pesalai South and Pesalai West. It has a population of about 8,000, 97% of which is Sri Lankan Tamil and the balance 3% Muslim. There are around 2,610 families and 7,350 persons in Pesalai, including Kataspathri, Siruthoppu and Murukankovil.

See also
Pesalai Church attack

References

External links
Pesalai community portal

Villages in Mannar District
Mannar DS Division